Orlando, My Political Biography is a 2023 French documentary film directed by Paul B. Preciado. Preciado organizes a casting and brings together 26 contemporary trans and non-binary people, aged 8 to 70, to bring out Orlando of Virginia Woolf's 1928 novel Orlando: A Biography. It was selected in Encounter at the 73rd Berlin International Film Festival, where it had its world premiere on 18 February 2023. The film was also nominated for Berlinale Documentary Film Award, and won the Teddy Award for the Best Documentary Film.

Content of the film
The film blurs the lines between reality and fiction. The director expands Virginia Woolf's novel Orlando: A Biography, in which the main character changes gender midway through the story to become a 36-year-old woman. He organizes a casting and brings together 26 contemporary trans and non-binary people, aged 8 to 70, to play Orlando. Preciado reconstructs the stages of his personal transformation through authentic voices, writings, theory and images, in the search of the truth. "Every Orlando", he says, "is a transgender person who is risking his, her or their life on a daily basis as they find themselves forced to confront government laws, history and psychiatry, as well as traditional notions of the family and the power of multinational pharmaceutical companies." The film emphasis, "if 'male' and 'female' are ultimately political and social fictions, then that change is no longer just about gender, but also about poetry, love and skin colour."

Cast
Oscar (Rosza) S Miller (Orlando)
Janis Sahraoui (Orlando)
Liz Christin (Orlando)
Elios Levy (Orlando)
Victor Marzouk (Orlando)
Paul B. Preciado (Orlando)
Kori Ceballos (Orlando)
Vanasay Khamphommala (Orlando)
Ruben Rizza (Orlando)
Julia Postollec (Orlando)
Amir Baylly (Orlando)
Naëlle Dariya (Orlando)
Jenny Bel’Air (Orlando)
Emma Avena (Orlando)
Lillie (Orlando)
Arthur (Orlando)
Eleonore (Orlando)
La Bourette (Orlando)
Noam Iroual (Orlando)
Iris Crosnier (Orlando)
Clara Deshayes (Orlando)
Castiel Emery (Sasha)
Fréderic Pierrot (Psychiatrist)
Nathan Callot (Armory Salesman)
Pierre et Gilles (Doctors)
Tristana Gray Martyr (Goddess of Hormones)
Le Filip (Goddess of Gender Fucking)
Miss Drinks (Goddess of Insurrection)
Tom Dekel (Receptionist)
Virginie Despentes (Judge)
Rilke & Pompom (Orlando's Dogs)

Release
it had its world premiere on 18 February 2023 in Encounter at the 73rd Berlin International Film Festival.

On 2 February, 2023 it was reported that Paris-based sales company The Party Film Sales has acquired world rights of the film. On 7 March 2023, it was reported that Sideshow and Janus Films bought the right of the film for North America. They are planning a theatrical release after screening of the film at high-profile festivals in North America.

Reception

Fabien Lemercier reviewing for Cineuropa praised the film and wrote, 
"I can say is that the hair-raising, super-inventive, intelligent and funny film doesn’t disappoint." Appreciating the director Preciado's creativity Lemercier stated, "he extrapolates Virginia Woolf’s tale with intellectual agility and cinematographic creativity and ultimately offering up an artisanal, philosophical, modern, and highly appealing vehicle for his activism." Laura Venning rated the film 4 out of 5 and wrote, "Paul B. Preciado's metatextual grappling with Virginia Woolf's novel is a playful and moving exploration of gender identity." Venning closing her review opined thar the film is "rightfully destined to become an enduring piece of trans filmmaking."
Redmond Bacon of Journey Into Cinema reviewing the film praised the film in general though Bacon felt it was a little stagey and repetitive in parts. Concluding his review Bacon wrote, "the final thesis is undeniably moving, ... this excellent film shows the power of imagination to potentially change the world."

Accolades

References

External links
 
 
 Orlando, My Political Biography at Berlinale
 Orlando, My Political Biography at Cineuropa 
 Orlando, My Political Biography on Screen International's official YouTube channel

2023 films
2020s French films
French documentary films
2023 documentary films
2020s French-language films
2023 LGBT-related films
French LGBT-related films
Transgender-related documentary films